Narayana Multispeciality Hospital, HSR Layout is a hospital in Bangalore, India and is part of the Narayana Health Group of Hospitals. The mani specialities of the hospital are day surgery, gastroenterology, cardiology, obstetrics and gynaecology and emergency services. The hospital is NABH accredited, and has three operating theaters and a catheterisation laboratory. The hospital services the residential communities residing in and around HSR Layout.

The hospital was commissioned in July 2013, and founded by cardiac surgeon Dr. Devi Prasad Shetty, who has performed nearly 15,000 cardiac surgeries. It provides services for non-invasive cardiology procedures, dialysis critical care units and radiology.

External links
 Official Website

References

Hospitals in Bangalore
Narayana Health
2013 establishments in Karnataka
Hospitals established in 2013